Ibus or IBus may refer to:

 Intelligent Input Bus (IBus), an input-method framework for Unix-like computer operating-systems
 iBus (London), an Automatic Vehicle Location system used on London's buses
 iBus (Indore), BRT buses of Indore
 International Bitterness Units scale (IBUs), a measure of the bitterness of beer
 iBUS (device), a bus-monitoring and -management device for road transport systems

See also
 Ibis